Trebor Jay Tichenor (January 28, 1940 - February 22, 2014) was a recognized authority on Scott Joplin and the ragtime era. He collected and published others' ragtime piano compositions and composed his own. He authored books about ragtime, and both on his own and as a member of The St. Louis Ragtimers, became a widely known ragtime pianist.

Biography 
Trebor Jay Tichenor was born in St. Louis, to Dr. Robert and Letitia Tichenor. His first name was formed by reversing the letters in his father's first name. He studied piano from the age of five and was influenced by hearing the ragtime piano playing of his mother in her band, Lettie's Collegiate Syncopators.

During the early 1950s, Lou Busch adopted the personality of Joe "Fingers" Carr, and made a series of ragtime recordings. These recordings mightily influenced Trebor's interests in the direction of ragtime. According to the noted sources, in the time frame from the mid-1950s to the early 1960s, when Tichenor wasn't acquiring first a high school degree from Country Day School (1958) and then a bachelor of arts from Washington University (1963), he was spending his time acquiring notable collections of original ragtime sheet music and piano rolls and making contact with the active members and legends of the continuing ragtime tradition.

By 1960,  Tichenor's house had become renowned in the area as a place where one could hear hours of excellent music by both amateur and professional ragtime musicians. He received encouragement to himself become a professional musician. In 1966 he married Jeanette. They had two children, Virginia (1966) and Andrew (1969). Jeanette died in 1986. Both children are professional musicians, and Virginia Tichenor is a professional ragtime musician.

In December 2013, Trebor Tichenor suffered a massive cerebral hemorrhage that left him debilitated and hospitalized. While in the process of recovery he died at LaClede Groves Rehabilitation Center on the afternoon of February 22, 2014, at age 74.

Professional career

Performance 
In the Fall of 1961 and with three other musicians, Al Stricker (voice, banjo), Don Franz (tuba), and Bill Mason (trumpet), Tichenor formed the ragtime group known as the St. Louis Ragtimers, still performing in 2010. They performed on the weekends in Gaslight Square during the first half of the 1960s. Starting in 1965, the St. Louis Ragtimers began to perform on the Goldenrod Showboat. According to Terry Waldo, the Ragtimers' forte is the performance of folk ragtime and ragtime songs which reflect the spirit and humor of the ragtime era. The tables at the end of this article show that Tichenor has regularly recorded ragtime music, both solo and with others, during a period of over 52 years, starting in 1962. For decades, Tichenor and the St. Louis Ragtimers have appeared at various early jazz and ragtime festivals throughout the United States, notably the Scott Joplin International Ragtime Festival and the West Coast Ragtime Festival.

Expertise and publication 
Tichenor was an acknowledged expert on aspects of ragtime and the ragtime era. He co-founded and co-edited the Ragtime Review in 1961. He co-authored an article on ragtime piano rolls. Various authors have noted that he had either the largest collection of ragtime piano rolls in the world, or one of them. In addition, he often made his significant collection of ragtime piano sheet music available, e.g., as in the publication of a definitive, two-volume set of Scott Joplin's collected rags. His relatively early conversations with ragtime figures such as Bob Darch and Arthur Marshall have led to discoveries in the history of ragtime. Attendant on the film The Sting, popular interest in ragtime was powerfully renewed. During his performance years at the Showboat Goldenrod, Tichenor did a brief stint around 1971 at community radio station KDNA-FM, St. Louis. In a one-hour weekly program, he introduced the radio audience to the history of ragtime. He contributed two volumes of a total of 127 rags which gave a broader perspective on the kind and quality of ragtime piano music of the years between 1897 and 1917. Ragtime Rarities was published in 1975, Ragtime Rediscoveries in 1979. With David A. Jasen, in 1978 Tichenor published a widely read compendium Rags and Ragtime: A Musical History. Tichenor has also written a number of short articles for various ragtime publications under the topics ragtime history, ragtime figures, and ragtime piano repertory. Finally, he has himself been the subject of various short articles as well as bibliographical citations. Tichenor had the weekly radio program Ragophile in St. Louis from 1973-1987. He taught the Ragtime course for many years as a Lecturer in Music at Washington University.

Composition
Tichenor began composing his own brand of country ragtime, completing about 2 dozen of them in a 25-year period. He was an acknowledged exponent of this folk ragtime. His three folios of rags are noted at the end of the article.

Solo Recordings

Recordings with others

Music folios 
Tichenor, T (1996). "Tempus Ragorum", Morgan Publishing.
Tichenor, T (2002). "Mississippi Valley Ragtime", Morgan Publishing.
Tichenor, T (2005). "Missouri Rags", Morgan Publishing.

See also 
List of ragtime composers

Footnotes

References 
Hasse, J E (1985). "Ragtime: Its History, Composers, and Music", Schrimer Books.
Jasen, D and Tichenor, T (1978). "Rags and Ragtime", The Seabury Press.
Tichenor, T (1975). "Ragtime Rarities", Dover Publications.
Tichenor, T (1979). "Ragtime Rediscoveries", Dover Publications.
Waldo, T (1976), "This Is Ragtime," Hawthorne.

External links 
Website of the St. Louis Ragtimers
West Coast Ragtime Society Bio
Ragtime for Tulsa Foundation Bio
Blues Rolls Bio

1940 births
2014 deaths
20th-century composers
20th-century pianists
Ragtime composers
Ragtime pianists